Pseudolaguvia lapillicola is a species of catfish  from the Kumaradhara River in Karnataka, Peninsular India.

References

Catfish of Asia
Fish of India
Taxa named by Ralf Britz, 
Taxa named by Palakkaparambil Hamsa Anver Ali
Taxa named by Rajeev Raghavan
Fish described in 2013
Erethistidae